Ougrapo stands for "Ouvroir du design graphique potentiel", which translates roughly as "workshop of potential graphic design", it was founded  in Frankfurt (Main), in 2000. Ougrapo is an archive and a workshop for "graphic design under constraints", researching, collecting and applying methods and processes to design.

See also

Ouxpo
Oulipo

References

External links 
 Ougrapo

'Pataphysics
German graphic designers